"Cold One Comin' On" is a song recorded by American country music duo Montgomery Gentry.  It was released in August 2001 as the second single from the album Carrying On.  The song reached #23 on the Billboard Hot Country Singles & Tracks chart.  The song was written by Mike Geiger, Woody Mullis and Michael Huffman.

Chart performance

References

2001 singles
Montgomery Gentry songs
Songs written by Mike Geiger
Songs written by Woody Mullis
Columbia Nashville Records singles
2001 songs